Popular Unity (Montenegrin and ) was a big tent opposition political alliance in Montenegro. The alliance was formed by two major opposition parties in Montenegro at time, the People's Party (NS) and Liberal Alliance of Montenegro (LSCG), prior to the 1996 parliamentary election. Slavko Perović's idea for the alliance was that it would open the way for "reconciliation between Montenegrins and Montenegrin Serbs". Kilibarda's party was Serbian nationalist. The main goal of the alliance was to overthrow the ruling Democratic Party of Socialists (DPS) of president Momir Bulatović, which has been in power since introduction of multi-party system. The coalition of liberals and populists won 24.91% of votes and gained only 19 MPs, 11 of which belonged to NS and 8 to LSCG. However, LSCG terminated the coalition after the decision of NS to enter into coalition with the ruling DPS.

Member parties

Elections

Parliamentary election

References

Political parties established in 1996
Defunct political party alliances in Montenegro